Glossodoris cincta is a species of sea slug, a dorid nudibranch, a shell-less marine gastropod mollusk in the family Chromodorididae. This name has been extensively used for a group of similarly coloured species, some of which are un-named.

Distribution 
This species was described from Ile Marianne, Fouquets Reef, Mauritius. This species has been reported in error widely in the Indo-Pacific region but these reports should be referred to Glossodoris acosti or undescribed Glossodoris species. The only reliable recent records are from Réunion.

Description 
Glossodoris cincta has a mantle which is tawny brown with blue-white dots and a dark blue margin to the mantle which is separated from the brown by a thin grey line. The rhinophores are dark brown with blue-white dots.

References

External links
 

Chromodorididae
Molluscs of the Indian Ocean
Gastropods described in 1888